Kadirpara Union is a union parishad situated at Sreepur Upazila,  in Magura District, Khulna Division of Bangladesh. There are 13 villages and 11 mouzas in the union.

References

External links
 

Unions of Khulna Division
Unions of Sreepur Upazila
Unions of Magura District